Nicolas Mahut was the defending champion, but lost in the quarterfinals to Samuel Groth.
Lleyton Hewitt won the title, defeating Ivo Karlović in the final, 6–3, 6–7(4–7), 7–6(7–3).

Seeds

Draw

Finals

Top half

Bottom half

Qualifying

Seeds

Qualifiers

Qualifying draw

First qualifier

Second qualifier

Third qualifier

Fourth qualifier

References

 Main Draw
 Qualifying Draw

Hall of Fame Tennis Championships - Singles